The 2024 United States presidential election in Delaware is scheduled to take place on Tuesday, November 5, 2024, as part of the 2024 United States elections in which all 50 states plus the District of Columbia will participate. Delaware voters will choose electors to represent them in the Electoral College via a popular vote. The state of Delaware has 3 electoral votes in the Electoral College, following reapportionment due to the 2020 United States census in which the state neither gained nor lost a seat.

Incumbent Democratic president and Delaware native Joe Biden has stated that he intends to run for reelection to a second term.

Primary elections

Republican primary

The Delaware Republican primary is scheduled to be held on April 23, 2024, alongside primaries in Maryland, Pennsylvania, and Rhode Island.

See also 
 United States presidential elections in Delaware
 2024 United States presidential election
 2024 Democratic Party presidential primaries
 2024 Republican Party presidential primaries
 2024 United States elections

References 

Delaware
2024
Presidential